This is a list of commercial banks in Eswatini
 Eswatini Bank
 Nedbank Eswatini
 Standard Bank Eswatini
 First National Bank Eswatini
 Eswatini Building Society

See also
 List of banks in Africa
 Central Bank of Eswatini
 Economy of Eswatini

References

External links
 Website of Central Bank of Eswatini

 
Banks
Eswatini
Eswatini